Anne Kakela (born June 22, 1970 in Steamboat Springs, Colorado) is an American rower. She finished 4th in the women's eight at the 1996 Summer Olympics.

She is now a coach for the US National rowing team.

References

External links
 
 

1970 births
Living people
Sportspeople from Colorado
Rowers at the 1996 Summer Olympics
Olympic rowers of the United States
American female rowers
World Rowing Championships medalists for the United States
People from Steamboat Springs, Colorado
21st-century American women